Kınık is a district of İzmir Province of Turkey.

References

 
Populated places in İzmir Province
Districts of İzmir Province